Leleupaussus tetramerus is a species of beetle in the family Carabidae, the only species in the genus Leleupaussus. L. tetramerus has been inconclusively suggested to be termitophilous.

References

Paussinae